Behavior modification is an early approach that used respondent and operant conditioning to change behavior. Based on methodological behaviorism, overt behavior was modified with consequences, including positive and negative reinforcement contingencies to increase desirable behavior, or administering positive and negative punishment and/or extinction to reduce problematic behavior. It also used Flooding desensitization to combat phobias.

Applied behavior analysis (ABA)—the application of behavior analysis—is the current term and is based on radical behaviorism, which refers to B. F. Skinner's viewpoint that cognition and emotions are covert behavior that are to be subjected to the same conditions as overt behavior.

Description
The first use of the term behavior modification appears to have been by Edward Thorndike in 1911. His article Provisional Laws of Acquired Behavior or Learning makes frequent use of the term "modifying behavior". Through early research in the 1940s and the 1950s the term was used by Joseph Wolpe's research group. The experimental tradition in clinical psychology used it to refer to psycho-therapeutic techniques derived from empirical research. It has since come to refer mainly to techniques for increasing adaptive behavior through reinforcement and decreasing maladaptive behavior through extinction or punishment (with emphasis on the former).

In recent years, the concept of punishment has had many critics, though these criticisms tend not to apply to negative punishment (time-outs) and usually apply to the addition of some aversive event. The use of positive punishment by board certified behavior analysts is restricted to extreme circumstances when all other forms of treatment have failed and when the behavior to be modified is a danger to the person or to others (see professional practice of behavior analysis). In clinical settings positive punishment is usually restricted to using a spray bottle filled with water as an aversive event. When misused, more aversive punishment can lead to affective (emotional) disorders, as well as to the receiver of the punishment increasingly trying to avoid the punishment (i.e., "not get caught")..

Behavior modification relies on the following:
 Reinforcement (positive and negative)
 Punishment (positive and negative)
 Extinction
 Shaping
 Fading
 Chaining

Some areas of effectiveness
Functional behavior assessment forms the core of applied behavior analysis. Many techniques in this therapy are specific techniques aimed at specific issues. Interventions based on behavior analytic principles have been extremely effective in developing evidence-based treatments.

In addition to the above, a growing list of research-based interventions from the behavioral paradigm exist. With children with attention deficit hyperactivity disorder (ADHD), one study showed that over a several-year period, children in the behavior modification group had half the number of felony arrests as children in the medication group. These findings have yet to be replicated, but are considered encouraging for the use of behavior modification for children with ADHD. There is strong and consistent evidence that behavioral treatments are effective for treating ADHD. A recent meta-analysis found that the use of behavior modification for ADHD resulted in effect sizes in between group studies (.83), pre-post studies (.70), within group studies (2.64), and single subject studies (3.78) indicating behavioral treatments are highly effective.

Behavior modification programs form the core of many residential treatment facility programs. They have shown success in reducing recidivism for adolescents with conduct problems and adult offenders. One particular program that is of interest is teaching-family homes (see Teaching Family Model), which is based on a social learning model that emerged from radical behaviorism. These particular homes use a family style approach to residential treatment, which has been carefully replicated over 700 times. Recent efforts have seen a push for the inclusion of more behavior modification programs in residential re-entry programs in the U.S. to aid prisoners in re-adjusting after release.

One area that has repeatedly shown effectiveness has been the work of behaviorists working in the area of community reinforcement for addictions. Another area of research that has been strongly supported has been behavioral activation for depression.

One way of giving positive reinforcement in behavior modification is in providing compliments, approval, encouragement, and affirmation; a ratio of five compliments for every one complaint is generally seen as being effective in altering behavior in a desired manner and even in producing stable marriages.

In job performance
Based on the conceptual premises of classical behaviorism and reinforcement theory, the Organizational Behavior Modification Model (aka O.B. Mod) represents a behavioral approach to the management of human resources in organizational settings. The application of reinforcement theory to modification of behavior as it relates to job performance first requires analysis of necessary antecedents (e.g., job design, training) of the desired behavior. After it has been determined that the necessary antecedents are present, managers must first identify the behaviors to change. These behaviors must be observable, measurable, task-related, and critical to the task at hand. Next, a baseline measure of the behavior must be assessed and functional consequences analyzed. Now that the link between the antecedent, behavior, and contingent consequences has been established, an intervention to change the behavior can be introduced. If the intervention is successful in modifying the behavior, it must be maintained using schedules of reinforcement and must be evaluated for performance improvement. The O.B. Mod has been found to have a significant positive effect on task performance globally, with performance on average increasing 17%.

A study that examined the differential effects of incentive motivators administered with the O.B. Mod on job performance found that using money as a reinforcer with O.B. Mod was more successful at increasing performance compared to routine pay for performance (i.e., money administered on performance not using O.B. Mod). The authors also found that using money administered through the O.B. Mod produced stronger effects (37% performance increase), compared to social recognition (24% performance increase) and performance feedback (20% performance increase).

Criticism

Behavior modification is critiqued in person-centered psychotherapeutic approaches such as Rogerian Counseling and Re-evaluation Counseling, which involve "connecting with the human qualities of the person to promote healing", while behaviorism is "denigrating to the human spirit". B.F. Skinner argues in Beyond Freedom and Dignity that unrestricted reinforcement is what led to the "feeling of freedom", thus removal of aversive events allows people to "feel freer". Further criticism extends to the presumption that behavior increases only when it is reinforced. This premise is at odds with research conducted by Albert Bandura at Stanford University. His findings indicate that violent behavior is imitated, without being reinforced, in studies conducted with children watching films showing various individuals "beating the daylights out of Bobo". Bandura believes that human personality and learning is the result of the interaction between environment, behavior and psychological process. There is evidence, however, that imitation is a class of behavior that can be learned just like anything else. Children have been shown to imitate behavior that they have never displayed before and are never reinforced for, after being taught to imitate in general.

Several people have criticized the level of training required to perform behavior modification procedures, especially those that are restrictive or use aversives, aversion therapy, or punishment protocols. Some desire to limit such restrictive procedures only to licensed psychologists or licensed counselors. Once licensed for this group, post-licensed certification in behavior modification is sought to show scope of competence in the area through groups like the World Association for Behavior Analysis. Still others desire to create an independent practice of behavior analysis through licensure to offer consumers choices between proven techniques and unproven ones (see Professional practice of behavior analysis). Level of training and consumer protection remain of critical importance in applied behavior analysis and behavior modification.

See also

 Acculturation
 Brainwashing
 Indoctrination 
 Psychological manipulation
 Recruitment
 Applied behavior analysis
 Behavior management
 Behavior therapy
 Classical conditioning
 Cognitive behavioral therapy
 Cognitive bias modification
 Conversion therapy
 Decoupling for body-focused repetitive behaviors	
 Covert conditioning	
 Habit Reversal Training	
 Life coaching
 Ole Ivar Lovaas
 Pain model of behaviour management
 Positive Behavior Interventions and Supports
 Sociology
 Edward Thorndike
 John B. Watson
 Behaviourism

References

External links

 
Behaviorism
Behavior